Nehemiah Broughton, Jr. (born November 4, 1982) is a former American football fullback. He was drafted by the Washington Redskins in the seventh round of the 2005 NFL Draft. He played college football at The Citadel.

Broughton has also been a member of the Carolina Panthers, Minnesota Vikings, New York Giants and Arizona Cardinals.

Early years
Broughton attended North Charleston High School in North Charleston, South Carolina. As a senior, he was an All-State, and an All-Low Country selection after rushing for 1,670 yards, and 23 touchdowns. After his senior football season, he participated in the All North-South game.

College career
Broughton attended The Citadel (The Military College of South Carolina). He finished his career with 581 carries for 2,638 yards (4.5 yards per car. avg.) and 25 touchdowns, 47 receptions for 455 yards (9.7 yards per rec. avg.) and three touchdowns, and two kickoff returns for 32 yards, for a grand total of 3,125 all-purpose yards, along with four tackles.  His 2,638 rushing yards rank fifth on the school's career-record list. He accomplished that, despite missing two games as a junior. He majored in Sports Management.

Professional career

Washington Redskins
Also known as a rookie phenom, Broughton tore his ACL in practice in May 2007 and spent the following season on injured reserve. As an exclusive-rights free agent in the 2008 offseason, he was non-tendered and became an unrestricted free agent. He was then re-signed on April 2.

The Redskins waived Broughton during final cuts on August 30, 2008 and re-signed him to the practice squad. He spent the entire 2008 season on the team's practice squad.

Carolina Panthers
After his practice squad contract with the Redskins expired following the 2008 season, Broughton was signed by the Carolina Panthers on January 15, 2009, however he was released on March 17, 2009.

Minnesota Vikings
Broughton was signed by the Minnesota Vikings on May 18, 2009. He was waived on September 5.

New York Giants
The New York Giants signed Broughton to their practice squad on September 7, where he remained through the regular season.

Arizona Cardinals
After his practice squad contract expired with the Giants, Broughton was signed by the Arizona Cardinals on January 5, 2010. He was released by the Cardinals on July 25, 2011.

References

External links
Arizona Cardinals bio
New York Giants bio
Washington Redskins bio

1982 births
Living people
People from North Charleston, South Carolina
Players of American football from South Carolina
American football fullbacks
The Citadel Bulldogs football players
Washington Redskins players
Carolina Panthers players
Minnesota Vikings players
New York Giants players
Arizona Cardinals players